Dónall Ó Cualáin (born 4 November 1957) is a former Irish Garda who served as Acting Garda Commissioner from September 2017 to September 2018, after the resignation of Nóirín O'Sullivan.

Biography
From Carna in the Gaeltacht area of Connemara, County Galway, Ó Culáin is a fluent Irish speaker.

He was appointed Deputy Garda Commissioner and Head of Governance and Strategy on 20 October 2015. Following the resignation of Nóirín O'Sullivan, Ó Cualáin was appointed as Acting Garda Commissioner on 11 September 2017, by the Minister for Justice and Equality Charles Flanagan.

PSNI Deputy Chief Constable Drew Harris was announced as the 21st Garda Commissioner by the Government of Ireland on 26 June 2018. Ó Cualáin remained in place as Acting Commissioner until the official appointment of Harris on 3 September 2018, after which he retired.

References

Garda Commissioners
Living people
People from County Galway
Alumni of Garda Síochána College
1957 births
21st-century Irish people